Sevara Nazarkhan is an Uzbek singer, songwriter, and musician. Her musical style incorporates Uzbek folk and contemporary music. Nazarkhan has achieved worldwide fame and has collaborated with high-profile international artists. In 2004, Nazarkhan received the BBC Radio 3 World Music Award in the category "Best Asian Artist".

Work
Nazarkhan started her solo career in 2000. In 2003, she released her critically acclaimed album Yoʻl boʻlsin on the UK label Real World Records. The album was produced by French producer Hector Zazou. Following the release, she extensively toured Europe and Asia with her band. She also was the support act in Peter Gabriel's Growing Up Tour 2004. The same year, she received the BBC Radio 3 World Music Award in the category "Best Asian Artist". 
 
In 2004, Sevara recorded Goʻzal dema – a collection of folk songs. It was a limited edition CD. In 2007, Real World Records releases her album Sen. Most of the music of that album was composed by Sevara. She brought two producers to work on this album – Bruno Ellingham and Victor Sologoub. In 2009, Sevara released a hit song titled "А Он Не Пришёл" in Russian, which became a major hit throughout the CIS countries.

Sevara's latest album, Tortadur – a collection of Uzbek traditional/classical songs – was released in the US on 11 October 2011, on her own record label, Sevaramusic. Sevara invited "the old school" instrumentalists for the live recording sessions. This album is not electronically treated.

In 2012 Sevara participated in the Russian version of "The Voice" show.

Sevara Nazarkhan appears on the following tracks/albums:

 Peace Song (Halla Bassam/Sevara Nazarxon) From the album Lullabies from the Axis of Evil;
 In Your Eyes (Peter Gabriel), Peter Gabriel – Growing Up Live (2003) DVD;
 My Secret Bliss (Iarla Duet With Sevara Nazarxon) – AfroCelt Sound System. From the album Volume 5: Anatomic (2005);
 Everything Comes From You (feat. Richard Evans, Joji Hirota, Sevara Nazarxon, Sinéad O'Connor, Guo Yue) – From the album Big Blue Ball by Peter Gabriel.

Filmography

Discography
 Yoʻl boʻlsin (Where are you Headed?) (2003)
 Goʻzal dema (Don't Say I'm Beautiful) (2004)
 Sen (You) (2007) 
 Tortadur (It Attracts) (2011)
 Maria Magdalena (2012)
 Pisma (2013)

References

External links

Official website
Record label site

1976 births
Uzbeks
Living people
Real World Records artists
21st-century Uzbekistani women singers
Folk-pop singers